Mystery Repeats is the second full-length album by Dutch hip hop duo Pete Philly and Perquisite. The album was released on September 7, 2007 in the Netherlands and Japan on ANTI- Records.

Track listing 
"Clap Kick Flow"
"Womb to Tomb"
"Fish to Fry" 
"Hectic"
"Q&A" 
"Believer"
"Awake"
"Traveller" (featuring Erminia Córdoba)
"Last Love Song"
"Freestyle"
"Third Degree"
"Balance" (featuring GMB)
"Empire"
"High Tide"
"Mystery Repeats"
"Time Flies"

Chart

References

External links 
Shooting the album cover video from MySpaceTV

2007 albums
Anti- (record label) albums
Pete Philly and Perquisite albums